Sevinch Rakhimova is an Uzbekistani karateka. She won the silver medal in the women's kumite 55kg event at the 2019 Asian Karate Championships held in Tashkent, Uzbekistan. She won one of the bronze medals in the women's 55kg event at the 2021 Islamic Solidarity Games held in Konya, Turkey.

In 2021, she competed at the World Olympic Qualification Tournament held in Paris, France hoping to qualify for the 2020 Summer Olympics in Tokyo, Japan. She lost her bronze medal match in the women's 55kg event at the 2021 World Karate Championships held in Dubai, United Arab Emirates.

Achievements

References

External links 
 

Living people
Year of birth missing (living people)
Place of birth missing (living people)
Uzbekistani female karateka
Islamic Solidarity Games medalists in karate
Islamic Solidarity Games competitors for Uzbekistan
21st-century Uzbekistani women